Argiope bruennichi (wasp spider) is a species of orb-web spider distributed throughout central Europe, northern Europe, north Africa, parts of Asia, and the Azores archipelago. Like many other members of the genus Argiope (including St Andrew's Cross spiders), it has striking yellow and black markings on its abdomen.

Web

The spider builds a spiral orb web at dawn or dusk, commonly in long grass a little above ground level, taking approximately an hour. The prominent zigzag shape called the stabilimentum, or web decoration, featured at the centre of the orb is of uncertain function, but it has been shown that webs containing stabilimenta catch fewer insects because they are less cryptic, but on the other hand these webs are less often damaged by birds flying through them.

When a prey item is first caught in the web, Argiope bruennichi will quickly immobilise its prey by wrapping it in silk. The prey is then bitten and then injected with a paralysing venom and a protein-dissolving enzyme.

Population

During Summer 2006, research was carried out in the UK to find that there has been an influx of these spiders to the UK. The colour is still similar, although the yellow stripes are a bit more cream-coloured.

Besides the nominate subspecies, there is one subspecies currently recognised:
 Argiope bruennichi nigrofasciata Franganillo, 1910 (Portugal)

Sexual dimorphism

Argiope bruennichi display a rather large distinction between males and females with males averaging length of approximately 4.5 mm and females averaging 15 mm. The reasons for this large difference has evolutionary and fitness background with regards to mating as well as cannibalism by the females towards the males after copulation.

Mating

The differences of size of these male spiders actually allows the males to come into contact with the females in relation to their orb webs. The male Argiope bruennichi are able to enter into the female's orb and thus make their webs without being detected as prey and thus eaten before they are able to mate, a major fitness advantage.

Plugging

Certain male Argiope bruennichi have an adaptation that they have developed to ensure that they will be the only mate with whom the female can produce offspring. Certain males are able to "plug" the female after they have mated with her to prevent other males from copulating with the female. This plugging involves losing one of his pedipalps, thus allowing him to only mate twice. This is a major reason as to why these males are always in a rush to mate after the female has completed her final moult. With males always waiting around for the female to reach full maturity, the race is on for the male who is small enough to not be detected, yet is also able to "plug" the female so that other males have a lower chance of competing for fertilization of her eggs. These spiders have evolved to become monogamous for the most part after mating because of this damage.

If the females are only able to reproduce once they must develop a method to produce more offspring at one time (per clutch). This can be caused by multiple things, including a sex ratio that forces these males to make sure they have at least one female to produce their offspring simply because there are not as many females present. If these females are only able to mate one time, they need to develop this larger clutch size to ensure that their genes are passed down from the surviving of her first clutch.

Females that consumed a small supplement of dietary essential amino acids produced offspring that survived simulated overwintering conditions significantly longer than offspring of other treatments. Results suggest that dietary essential amino acids, which may be sequestered by males from their diet, could be valuable supplements that increase the success of the offspring of cannibalistic females.

Cannibalism
Argiope bruennichi participate in sexual cannibalism. The females of this species, typically much larger than the males, almost always consume their male counterparts after copulation.

To combat this, males often wait in or near an immature female's web until she completes her final moult and reaches sexual maturity. After moulting, the female's chelicerae will be soft for a short period and the male may mate without the danger of being eaten.

References

External links

 
 

bruennichi

Cosmopolitan spiders
Spiders described in 1772
Spiders of Africa
Spiders of Asia
Spiders of Europe
Taxa named by Giovanni Antonio Scopoli
Articles containing video clips